Stara Drenčina  is a village in Croatia, part of the municipality of Sisak, which itself is a part of Sisak-Moslavina County.

History 
The earliest mention of this town was in 1215 under the name "praedium Drencina" In 217 it appeared as "Drenchina"; in 1541 and 1544 as "Drenchyna" and "Inferior Drenchyna" in records. In 1597, its castle was mentioned under the name "Drenczina". The castle was built as part of defense against Ottoman incursion. After the decline of Turkish threat during the second half of 17th century, the village was settled by a Croatian population. In 1773 it is listed as "Dorf Drenchina" on the Josephinian Land Survey.

In the early years of the 20th century, declining economic situation forced many of its population to emigrate overseas. In 1918, the town became part of the newly-formed Serbian-Croatian-Slovenian state, which later would form Yugoslavia. During World War II, it was part of the Independent State of Croatia. There was a period of peace following the war, as Socialist Federal Republic of Yugoslavia reintegrated the area. On June 25, 1991, the village became part of Croatia.

Population 
In the 2011 population census, Stara Drenčina had 226 inhabitants. Below is a table of historical population from 1857 to 2011:

Note: Until 1880, the town was recorded under the name Drenčina

Landmarks 
Stara Drenčina has a small wooden chapel dedicated to John the Baptist. It was first mentioned in record in 1696. The church was completely renovated in 1731, and its tower was built at roughly the same time. The main alter was built in 1740, which was done along with painting of the interior.

The town also has the remnant of the castle of Drencsina. The castle was built as part of the defense along the Kupa River. As the border with Ottoman Empire shifted south, its role ceased by the end of the 17th century.

References

Populated places in Sisak-Moslavina County